OPPPP (1-(3-Oxo-3-phenylpropyl)-4-phenyl-4-piperidinyl propionate) is an opioid drug related to medicines such as prodine. It is one of several compounds derived from MPPP, the reverse ester of pethidine, which were sold as designer drugs in the 1980s, but have been rarely encountered by law enforcement since the passage of the Federal Analogue Act in 1986. In animal studies it was found to be around 1000x the potency of pethidine, making it several times the potency of fentanyl and with similar hazards of respiratory depression and overdose. It is closely related to numerous compounds made by Janssen et al. for which the structure-activity relationship is well established.

See also
 Homofentanyl
 PEPAP
 LY-88329

References 

4-Phenylpiperidines
Mu-opioid receptor agonists
Synthetic opioids